Bash-Kuugandy is a village in Naryn Region of Kyrgyzstan. It is part of the Jumgal District. Its population was 3,218 in 2021.

References
 

Populated places in Naryn Region